The Royal Winnipeg Rifles (R Wpg Rif) are a Primary Reserve one-battalion infantry regiment of the Canadian Army. Nicknamed the "Little Black Devils", they are based at Minto Armoury in Winnipeg, Manitoba. The Royal Winnipeg Rifles are part of 3rd Canadian Division's 38 Canadian Brigade Group.

Lineage

The Royal Winnipeg Rifles 

 Originated on 9 November, 1883, in Winnipeg, Manitoba, as the 90th Winnipeg Battalion of Rifles
 Redesignated on 8 May, 1900, as the 90th Regiment Winnipeg Rifles
 Redesignated on 12 March, 1920, as The Winnipeg Rifles
 Redesignated on 3 June, 1935, as The Royal Winnipeg Rifles
 Redesignated on 7 November, 1940, as the 2nd (Reserve) Battalion, The Royal Winnipeg Rifles
 Redesignated on 28 March, 1946, as The Royal Winnipeg Rifles
 Amalgamated on 30 June, 1955, with The Winnipeg Light Infantry Retaining its designation.

The Winnipeg Light Infantry 

 Originated on 1 April 1912, in Winnipeg, Manitoba, as the 106th Regiment, Winnipeg Light Infantry.
 Redesignated on 12 March 1920, as The Winnipeg Light Infantry.
 Redesignated on 15 December 1936, as The Winnipeg Light Infantry (Machine Gun).
 Redesignated on 18 March 1942, as the 2nd (Reserve) Battalion, The Winnipeg Light Infantry (Machine Gun).
 Redesignated on 1 June 1945, as The Winnipeg Light Infantry (Machine Gun).
 Redesignated on 1 April 1946, as The Winnipeg Light Infantry.
 Amalgamated on 30 June 1955, with The Royal Winnipeg Rifles.

Lineage Chart of the Royal Winnipeg Rifles: 

|style="text-align: left;"|

Perpetuations

North-West Rebellion 

 91st "Winnipeg" Battalion of Light Infantry of 1885–1888

The Great War 

 8th Battalion (90th Winnipeg Rifles), CEF
 10th Battalion (Canadians), CEF
 27th Battalion (City of Winnipeg), CEF
 44th Battalion (Manitoba), CEF
 61st Battalion (Winnipeg), CEF
 90th Battalion (Winnipeg Rifles), CEF
 101st Battalion (Winnipeg Light Infantry), CEF
 144th Battalion (Winnipeg Rifles), CEF
 190th Battalion (Winnipeg Rifles), CEF
 203rd Battalion (Winnipeg Rifles), CEF
 222nd Battalion, CEF
 226th Battalion (Men of the North), CEF

History

Early History 
The 90th Winnipeg Battalion of Rifles were formed on 9 November 1883 under the command of Lieutenant Colonel William Nassau Kennedy. Within two years of formation, the 90th battalion served in the 1885 North-West Rebellion, fighting at Fish Creek and Batoche. After the Battle of Fish Creek, a captured Métis asked, "The red coats we know, but who are those little black devils?" – infantry of the line wore red tunics, but the Winnipeg soldiers were clad in rifle green, a shade dark enough to be mistaken for black. From that point on, the 90th Rifles (and later Royal Winnipeg Rifles) became informally nicknamed the "Little Black Devils".

Some former members of the 90th Rifles served in South Africa during the Second Boer War as members of other Canadian units, resulting in the award of the South Africa 1899–1900 battle honour.

The First World War 
The regiment raised several battalions for the Canadian Expeditionary Force in the Great War, the most notable being the 8th Battalion (90th Winnipeg Rifles), CEF, which served in the 2nd Infantry Brigade, 1st Canadian Division. The battalion saw some of the heaviest fighting in World War I, distinguishing itself at battles such as Ypres, the Somme, Vimy, Passchendaele, Amiens, Arras and Cambrai.

Three members of the 8th battalion were awarded Canada's highest honour for gallantry in the face of the enemy, the Victoria Cross.

1920s-1930s 
In the 1920 reorganization of the Canadian Militia following the report of the Otter Committee, the regiment's former designation as 90th Regiment was dropped and became known as The Winnipeg Rifles.  In 1935 the unit was awarded the prefix 'Royal' for its distinguished service to King George V, and the current designation of The Royal Winnipeg Rifles (R Wpg Rif) was adopted.

The Second World War 
In World War II the regiment landed in England in September 1940. As part of the 7th Canadian Infantry Brigade, 3rd Canadian Infantry Division, the Rifles were in the first wave of landings on D Day, 6 June 1944. The Royal Winnipeg Rifles fought throughout the Normandy campaign, fighting in famous battles such as Caen and the Falaise Gap. After helping liberate several of the Channel Ports, the regiment fought to clear the Scheldt Estuary to allow the re-opening of the Antwerp harbour. After helping to liberate the Netherlands, the regiment ended the war preparing to assault the northern German town of Aurich.

Three battalions of the regiment served during the Second World War. The 1st Battalion served in the 3rd Canadian Infantry Division, the 2nd Battalion was a reserve unit that remained on part-time duty in Winnipeg, and a 3rd Battalion served in the Canadian Army Occupation Force.

The 1st Battalion were among the first Allied troops to land on the Normandy beaches on D-Day. They served throughout the Northwest Europe campaign, including the Battle of the Scheldt, the Rhineland, and the final battles across the Rhine, before returning to Canada in 1945. The 3rd Battalion was raised in 1945 and remained in Germany until 1946.

Post-WWII to the Present 
In 1950 the regiment helped the civil authority during the Winnipeg flood during Operation Red Ramp. During 1951–53, they provided men to the 1st Canadian Rifle Battalion for NATO duty with 27th Canadian Infantry Brigade in Germany. Members of the regiment also served with other units during the Korean War. In 1955, The Winnipeg Light Infantry amalgamated with The Royal Winnipeg Rifles bringing together the histories and traditions of two military units with no change in designation.   

On 6 June 1964, a commemorative D-Day monument was erected on the beaches at Courseulles-sur-Mer. In 1978 Prince Charles, The Prince of Wales, became the Colonel-in-Chief of the regiment. Subsequently, a contingent of Rifles attended the wedding of Prince Charles to Lady Diana Spencer on 29 July 1981.

In 1983 The Royal Winnipeg Rifles, celebrated a one hundred years of military service to Canada with numerous events and an official postage stamp.

The regiment contributed numerous soldiers to overseas deployments in the Balkans and to Canadian operations in Afghanistan.

In 2009, the Royal Winnipeg Rifles and the Queen's Own Cameron Highlanders (both stationed at Minto Armoury) merged into the Winnipeg Infantry Tactical Group (Wpg Inf Tac Grp, or WITG).  Both infantry regiments retained a large majority of their traditions but had a mixed and fully cooperative chain of command with only one commanding officer (CO) for both units. In 2018, the units were disaggregated, now with two separate chains of command and with different roles. The new main role for the Royal Winnipeg Rifles is maintaining the Arctic Response Company Group.

Structure 
Leadership and appointments
Colonel-in-Chief: Charles III
Honorary Colonel: Emőke Szathmáry
Honorary Lieutenant-Colonel: Abdo El Tassi
Commanding Officer: Lieutenant-Colonel Dennis G. Desrochers
Regimental Sergeant Major: Chief Warrant Officer Joel Alo
Band Sergeant Major: Master Warrant Officer Emily Kenny
Battalion structure
Alpha Company
Regimental Band
Ceremonial Detachment (The Skirmishers and The Pioneers)
Sub-Units

The Royal Winnipeg Rifles Band 
The Regimental Band is as old as the Regiment, dating back to 1883, making it the oldest concert band in Winnipeg. In 1885, members of the band accompanied the Regiment to the Northwest Rebellion. At first consisting only of buglers and drummers, the band has developed into a professional brass and reed concert band, capable of supporting vocals and a multitude of styles and genres in its repertoire, while maintaining its traditions with a bugle line. Bugles, by tradition and practical use, are closely associated with Rifle Regiments; in garrison and on the battlefield, orders were relayed by buglers. Today the Band continues to entertain the people of Manitoba and assist in the esprit de corps of the Regiment. Bands of the perpetuated regiments date back to when the 106th Winnipeg Light Infantry Band was organized. During the First World War, bandmaster Thomas William James took the band to England where it would merge with the 10th Battalion Band to become the first Canadian band to serve on French soil.

Traditions
The Royal Winnipeg Rifles follow the traditions of rifle regiments throughout the Commonwealth. Thus they do not have a stand of regimental colours, and they march at the traditional rate of 140 paces a minute instead of the CF standard 120.  Rifles are usually carried "at the trail". Battle honours are borne on the cap badge and drums. The regimental badge depicts a devil carrying a trident and in imitation of a rifleman's role on the battlefield, he is depicted as running.  As is also traditional in rifle regiments for reasons of concealment, buttons and badges are "blackened" or darkened and are not polished.

The rank designation of a trained private (one chevron) of the Royal Winnipeg Rifles is "Rifleman."

The regimental band's drums are emblazoned with the unit's battle honours. The regimental pioneers form the escort to the colours when on parade. The pioneers wear leather aprons and carry special tools and weapons: axes or hatchets, picks, and halberds.  Along with the pioneers there are also skirmishers who wear the traditional uniform of a 90th Battalion rifleman circa 1885.  The skirmishers often appear in ceremonies and memorials such as Remembrance Day and events.

The regimental march of the Royal Winnipeg Rifles is "Pork, Beans and Hard Tack (Old Solomon Levi)" and the double quick march is "The Keel Row."

Alliances 
  — The Rifles

Battle honours

In the list below, battle honours in small capitals were awarded for participation in large operations and campaigns, while those in lowercase indicate honours granted for more specific battles. The battle honours in bold type are emblazoned on the cap badge.

Recognition
On 10 November 1983 Canada Post issued 'The Royal Winnipeg Rifles, The Royal Canadian Dragoons
as part of the Canadian Forces, Regiments, 1883–1983 series. The stamps were designed by Ralph Tibbles, based on a painting by William Southern. The 32¢ stamps are perforated 13.5 x 13 and were printed by Canadian Bank Note Company, Limited.

Royal Canadian Army Cadets

The RWR has an army cadet corps of the same name, Royal Winnipeg Rifles Cadet Corps, formed in 1947. The cadet corps is based at Minto Armoury in Winnipeg.

Notable Members 

 Lieutenant Colonel William Nassau Kennedy
 Lieutenant Hugh John Macdonald 
 Major Frank Fane 
 Captain Frank Mackenzie Ross 
 Lieutenant Colonel Jeff Nicklin 
 Major Clifford Chadderton 
 Pilot Officer Art Grant
 Warrant Officer Robert Falcon Ouellette
 Lieutenant Gordon A. Smith 
 Acting Commissioner Zachary Taylor Wood

Victoria Cross holders
 Alexander Picton Brereton
 Frederick George Coppins
 Frederick William Hall
 Andrew Mynarski

The Royal Winnipeg Rifles Museum and Archives

The museum preserves the history of The Royal Winnipeg Rifles through the collection, conservation and display of artefacts and archives commencing with the Red River Expedition of 1870 to the present. It provides a source of training in the regiment's history for all members of the regiment and the public, fostering an interest, knowledge and sense of pride in the regiment's activities and accomplishments. It also maintains a current record of all regimental memorials and monuments in Canada and elsewhere. The Museum is affiliated with: CMA, CHIN and Virtual Museum of Canada.

Media
 Named by the Enemy: A History of the Royal Winnipeg Rifles by Brian A. Reid (Jan 31 2010)
 Little Black Devils: A History of the Royal Winnipeg Rifles by Bruce; Wells, Eric Tascona (1983)

See also

 The Canadian Crown and the Canadian Forces
 38 Canadian Brigade Group Website (ref: Royal Winnipeg Rifles)

Order of precedence

References

External links

 
 The Royal Winnipeg Rifles site (unofficial)
 The Royal Winnipeg Rifles (Army.ca)
 The Royal Winnipeg Rifles Museum and Archives

Royal Winnipeg Rifles
1883 establishments in Manitoba
Canadian Militia units of The North-West Rebellion
Infantry regiments of Canada in World War II
Military units and formations established in 1883
Regimental museums in Canada